Shore Cottage is a building in Luss, Argyll and Bute, Scotland. A Category C listed cottage dating from the early to mid-19th century, it overlooks the western shore of Loch Lomond to the south of Luss village. It is the only building on the southern stretch of the shore path; between the cottage and the village are the back gardens of the properties on Church Road to the west.

, the cottage is the home of The Clan Shop.

See also
List of listed buildings in Luss, Argyll and Bute

References

External links
Luss, Shore Cottage – Canmore

19th-century establishments in Scotland
Listed buildings in Luss, Argyll and Bute
Category C listed buildings in Argyll and Bute